Ángeles de Puebla (English: Puebla Angels) is a Mexican professional basketball team based in Puebla, Mexico that plays in the Liga Nacional de Baloncesto Profesional (LNBP). The team plays their home games in the Gimnasio Miguel Hidalgo.

Franchise history 
The Ángeles were founded in 2007 by Luis Ontañón León, a local business man who has been in charge of the club since then. The club's original colors were red and white, these were later changed to blue and white.

Players

Current roster

See also
Liga Nacional de Baloncesto Profesional
FIBA Americas League

External links
 official site
Liga Nacional de Baloncesto Professional
FIBA Americas League

Basketball teams in Mexico
Sports teams in Puebla
Sport in Puebla (city)
Basketball teams established in 2007
2007 establishments in Mexico